The Raymond Stampede is an annual rodeo that is held in the town of Raymond, Alberta, Canada every 1 July.

Famous for being Alberta's oldest rodeo, the Raymond Stampede is also known for being Canada's oldest professional rodeo, having started a full decade before the Calgary Stampede.

Early history
The Raymond Stampede was first held on a vacant lot in 1902, as part of the town's first Canada Day celebration.

Under the direction of rancher Raymond Knight, cowboys from the surrounding ranches were invited to participate in this first rodeo, which consisted of saddle bronc riding and steer roping.

A chute was built for the steer roping, but the bucking horses were all "blindfolded and snubbed" and then ridden until the horse stopped bucking.

Ray Knight was the stock contractor, providing bucking horses and roping steers from off his ranch, some miles south of town on the Milk River Ridge.

Hundreds of spectators witnessed the first Raymond Stampede.  DeLoss Lund, a cowboy from the Hat L Ranch dressed in fur chaps, rode the first bucking horse. In the end, Ed Corless won the bronc riding competition, and Ray Knight won the steer roping competition.

The first Raymond Stampede contestants included Raymond Knight, DeLoss Lund, Ed Corless, Dick Kinsey, Frank Faulkner, Jim Austin, and Steve Austin.

As a rodeo pioneer, Raymond Knight has been called the "Father of Canadian Stampedes" having coined the rodeo terms "stampede" and "stampeding." These two words are now in common use for "rodeo" and "rodeoing."

The Raymond Stampede and Calgary Stampede are among almost 300 different rodeo events around the world, from North America to Australia, that use the word "stampede" in their name.

In 1903, the Raymond Stampede benefactor, Raymond Knight, financed the construction of Canada's first permanent rodeo grounds with an engineered oval track, a single bucking chute and a covered grandstands.  This rodeo grandstand is the oldest continuously used in rodeo history.  The bucking chute, which was a "shot-gun" style, was the first ever built in rodeo history.

The Raymond Stampede and the rodeo grounds were named for Raymond Knight who financed the rodeo and served as the arena director for almost 40 years. The town of Raymond, as well as the local school, the college and the opera house were also named for Raymond Knight.

The Raymond Stampede of 1903 was the first professional rodeo in Canada with official contest rules, entry fees and prize money.

Ray Knight has been called the "Father of Canadian Professional Rodeo" because of the 1903 Raymond Stampede.

Ray Knight was the world's richest rodeo producer and rodeo contractor with ranch land of almost one million acres, pasturing 18,000 head of cattle and some 2,000 head of horses.

Rodeo events held at the Raymond Stampede over the years include the rough stock events of saddle bronc, bareback bronc and bull riding but also steer riding, saddled bull riding, steer decorating, steer wrestling, calf roping, steer roping, barrel racing, wild horse racing, wild cow milking, chariot racing, Roman standing racing, cowboy saddle horse racing, and Indian pony racing.

In 1924, the Raymond Stampede replaced their shotgun style bucking chute with the safer "Bascom bucking chutes" which were side-delivery reverse opening bucking chutes invented by the Bascoms in 1919.

Raymond Knight, who was called the "Buffalo Bill of Canada" by the King of England, introduced the event of calf roping to Canada at the Raymond Stampede.  Knight has been called the "Father of Canadian Calf Roping" and won the North American Calf Roping Championship in 1924 and 1926 at the Calgary Stampede.

In 1934, the world's first "senior professional calf roping event" was held at the Raymond Stampede with Raymond Knight winning first place, Tom Three Persons placing second and Joe Snow at third place.

Famous bucking horses used in the early history of the Raymond Stampede include Easy Money, Box Car, Slim Sweden, Wild Boy, Calico Kid, Jack Dempsey, Tommy Gibbons, Ironsides, Lonely Valley Grey, C Cross Black, C Cross Grey, Horned Toad, Hot Shot, Spot-on-the-Belly and Fox. 
 
The bucking horse "Fox," which was owned by the Knight and Day Stampede Company in a partnership of ranchers Raymond Knight and Addison Day, was sold to the Pendleton Roundup in Oregon and renamed to "No Name."  The bucking horse "No Name" was later featured in "Ripley's Believe It or Not" as the "greatest bucking horse of all time."

Raymond Stampede's most famous bucking bull was Romeo which was only to be ridden with a saddle.  Only two cowboys successfully rode Romeo to the whistle - Mel Bascom and his brother Earl Bascom in 1928.

Due to the traditional Sabbath observance of the Town of Raymond's predominant Latter-day Saint community, the Stampede is held on 30 June in years when 1 July lands on a Sunday.

The Raymond Stampede has been held every year since 1902, except 1917–18 (because of the Spanish Flu), 1937 (because of severe drought) and 2020 (because of the Covid pandemic). The event has been managed and directed by the Raymond Stampede Committee, headed for many years by rodeo director Alan Heggie and family.

Raymond Stampede contestants and performers of note
 Earl W. Bascom
 Texas Rose Bascom
 Raymond Knight
 Reg Kesler
 Herman Linder
 Tom Three Persons

See also
 Festivals in Alberta
 Canadian Finals Rodeo

External links
  Earl W. Bascom website

References

Rodeos
Rodeo in Canada
Festivals in Alberta
Equestrian sports competitions in Canada
Raymond, Alberta